Jerome Grossman (August 23, 1917 – December 18, 2013) was a political activist and commentator, particularly on the issues of weapons of mass destruction and nuclear weapons. A self-styled "relentless liberal", Grossman played roles in many electoral campaigns and efforts to end the Vietnam War and the Iraq War.

Born in Boston, Massachusetts, raised in Brookline, he lived in Newton for 30 years, then in Wellesley for 30 years. A 1938 graduate of Harvard College, Grossman taught at Tufts University and Palm Beach Community College. He was the author of Relentless Liberal (New York, Vantage Press, 1996) and a contributing author to such publications as The Chicago Tribune.

Grossman had a number of careers:
Business as President of Massachusetts Envelope Company, now Grossman Marketing Group
Education as lecturer at Tufts University, Regis College, Palm Beach Community College
Politics as Member, Democratic National Committee
Chairman, Father Drinan for Congress
Director, Eugene McCarthy presidential campaign, 1968
Director, George McGovern presidential campaign, 1972
Manager, Stuart Hughes for Senate
Anti-war activist as Chairman, Council for a Livable World
Originator, Vietnam Moratorium Movement
Radio Commentator at WCRB – Massachusetts, WJNO – Florida
Civil Liberties as Chairman, Civil Liberties Union of Massachusetts Foundation

References

External links
Interview
The Relentless Liberal weblog

1917 births
2013 deaths
People from Brookline, Massachusetts
Harvard College alumni
Tufts University faculty
American anti-war activists